Carlton Goring is a male former weightlifter who competed for England.

Weightlifting career
He represented Guyana in the 1958 British Empire and Commonwealth Games in Cardiff, Wales. Four years later he represented England and won the gold medal in the -67.5 kg combined category at the 1962 British Empire and Commonwealth Games in Perth, Western Australia.

Personal life
He was a post office sorter by trade and lived in Tooting.

References

English male weightlifters
Commonwealth Games medallists in weightlifting
Commonwealth Games gold medallists for England
Weightlifters at the 1958 British Empire and Commonwealth Games
Weightlifters at the 1962 British Empire and Commonwealth Games
Medallists at the 1962 British Empire and Commonwealth Games